"Paranoid" is a song by English heavy metal band Black Sabbath, released in 1970 off the band's second studio album Paranoid (1970). It is the first single from the album, while the B-side is the song "The Wizard". It reached number 4 on the UK Singles Chart and number 61 on the US Billboard Hot 100.

Song information
"Paranoid" was the first Black Sabbath single release, coming six months after their self-titled debut was released. Black Sabbath bassist Geezer Butler (from Guitar World magazine, March 2004):

The song is an E minor pentatonic and only uses power chords. The guitar solo is a dry signal on the left channel, which is patched through a ring modulator and routed to the right channel; this effect was used again on the song 1978 "Johnny Blade".

According to extant lyric sheets, "Paranoid" was at one time titled "The Paranoid."

"Paranoid" eventually became the name of the album, and somewhat unusually, the word paranoid is never mentioned in the lyrics. Originally the band had wanted to call the album War Pigs after the song of the same name, but the record company persuaded them to use "Paranoid" instead because it was less offensive.

"Paranoid" drew controversy for apparently encouraging suicide, much like the song "Suicide Solution". Particularly, the lyric "I tell you to enjoy life" was misheard as "I tell you to end your life".

Reception
Cash Box described the song as being "as dense, musically as 'Whole Lotta Love,'" stating that "crashing, non-stop beat with gobs of bass and drums laced liberally with stinging, echoey vocals and hot guitar licks move the song along at a blistering pace."

"Paranoid" was ranked No. 34 on VH1's 40 Greatest Metal Songs. In March 2005, Q magazine placed it at number 11 in its list of the 100 Greatest Guitar Tracks. Rolling Stone ranked it number 250 on their list of the 500 Greatest Songs of All Time. "Paranoid" was ranked the fifth best Black Sabbath song by Rock - Das Gesamtwerk der größten Rock-Acts im Check. In 2020, Kerrang ranked the song number five on their list of the 20 greatest Black Sabbath songs, and in 2021, Louder Sound ranked the song number six on their list of the 40 greatest Black Sabbath songs.

Personnel
 Ozzy Osbourne – vocals
 Tony Iommi – guitar
 Geezer Butler – bass
 Bill Ward – drums

Accolades

(*) designates unordered lists.

Track listing
7" single (Vertigo 6059 010)
 "Paranoid" – 2:45
 "The Wizard" – 4:20

7" single (Vertigo 6059 014)
"Paranoid" – 2:50
"Rat Salad" – 2:30

7" singles (Vertigo AS 109)
"Paranoid" – 2:50
"Happy Being Me" – 15:54

7" 1977 re-release (Immediate 103 466)
"Paranoid" – 2:50
"Evil Woman" – 3:25

7" 1977 re-release (Nems SRS 510.044)
"Paranoid" – 2:50
"Tomorrow's Dream" – 3:11

7" 1980 re-release (Spiegelei INT 110.604)
 "Paranoid" – 2:45
 "Snowblind" – 5:25

Note
I "Happy Being Me" is performed by Manfred Mann Chapter Three and appears on their second album Manfred Mann Chapter Three Volume Two.

Charts

Certifications

Legacy
In 1971, German schlager vocal duo Cindy & Bert covered the song with lyrics based on Arthur Conan Doyle's The Hound of the Baskervilles as "Der Hund von Baskerville". The unlikely cover version with a heavy hammond organ,  featured in a TV show with a tiny Pekingese dog standing in as "hound" and dancers getting ushered back to their seats, has become a collector's curiosity and a document of 1971 zeitgeist. 
American punk rock group the Dickies covered the song for their debut album The Incredible Shrinking Dickies (1979). Released as  single, it charted at #45 in the UK. 
The song was covered by industrial rock group the Clay People for the various artists compilation album Shut Up Kitty, released in 1993.
Soft Cell covered "Paranoid" on early live shows, before releasing their debut album; a demo recording of the cover was released on the compilation album The Bedsit Tapes in 2005.
A live version by Doctor and the Medics was included on the 12" of their single "Burn", in 1986.
Skrewdriver covered the song for their The Strong Survive album in 1990.
Thrash metal band Megadeth covered the song for the 1994 rendition of Nativity in Black: A Tribute to Black Sabbath. The cover also appeared on the Hidden Treasures EP released in 1995.
Weezer include a cover of the song on their covers album The Teal Album.
The original Black Sabbath recording has been used numerous times in various films and television shows including Sid & Nancy, Dazed and Confused, The Stoned Age, Any Given Sunday, Almost Famous, We Are Marshall, The Angry Birds Movie, Suicide Squad, Kong: Skull Island and CHiPs,. The song was used in the video games Rock n' Roll Racing, Guitar Hero 3, Madden NFL 10, WWE 2K17, and Dave Mirra Freestyle BMX 2.

Popular culture
In Finland, "Paranoid" has the same status as Lynyrd Skynyrd's "Free Bird" in the United States as a song the audience finds humorous to request during a concert. So regardless of a band or the style of music in question, somebody may shout "Soittakaa 'Paranoid'!" ("Play 'Paranoid'!") during a gig.

References

External links

Black Sabbath songs
1970 singles
Number-one singles in Germany
Songs written by Ozzy Osbourne
Songs written by Tony Iommi
Songs written by Geezer Butler
Songs written by Bill Ward (musician)
Vertigo Records singles
1970 songs
UK Independent Singles Chart number-one singles
Weezer songs